is a former Japanese football player.

Club career
Sugiyama was born in Fujieda on May 17, 1960. After graduating from Tokyo University of Agriculture, he joined Japan Soccer League club Nissan Motors in 1983. He played as regular player from first season and the club won the champions 1983 and 1985 Emperor's Cup. From 1988 to 1990, the club won all three major title in Japan; Japan Soccer League, JSL Cup and Emperor's Cup for 2 years in a row. The club also won the champions 1990 JSL Cup. He moved to Division 2 club Sumitomo Metal (later Kashima Antlers) in 1991. In 1992, Japan Soccer League was folded and founded new league J1 League. The club won the 2nd place 1993 J1 League and 1993 Emperor's Cup. He moved to Japan Football League club Kyoto Purple Sanga in 1994. In 1995, although his opportunity to play decreased, the club won the 2nd place and was promoted to J1 League. He retired end of 1996 season.

National team career
In August 1979, when Sugiyama was a Tokyo University of Agriculture student, he was selected Japan U-20 national team for 1995 World Youth Championship. But he did not play in the match.

Club statistics

References

External links

Profile at awx.jp

1960 births
Living people
Tokyo University of Agriculture alumni
Association football people from Shizuoka Prefecture
Japanese footballers
Japan Soccer League players
J1 League players
Japan Football League (1992–1998) players
Yokohama F. Marinos players
Kashima Antlers players
Kyoto Sanga FC players
Association football defenders
People from Fujieda, Shizuoka